The Feneș is a tributary of the river Timiș in Romania. It discharges into the Timiș near Armeniș. The upper course of the river, upstream of the confluence with the Pârâul Alb, is also known as Pârâul Lung.

References

Rivers of Romania
Rivers of Caraș-Severin County